A list of films produced in Italy in 1940 (see 1940 in film):

External links
Italian films of 1940 at the Internet Movie Database

Italian
1940
Films